"Free Man in Paris" is a song written by Canadian singer-songwriter Joni Mitchell. It appeared on her 1974 album Court and Spark, as well as her 1980 live album Shadows and Light. It is ranked No. 470 on Rolling Stones list of the 500 Greatest Songs of All Time.

Background
The song is about music agent/promoter David Geffen, a close friend of Mitchell in the early 1970s, and describes Geffen during a trip the two made to Paris with Robbie and Dominique Robertson. 
While Geffen is never mentioned by name, Mitchell describes how he works hard creating hits and launching careers but can find some peace while vacationing in Paris.  Mitchell sings "I was a free man in Paris. I felt unfettered and alive. Nobody calling me up for favors. No one's future to decide."

Reception
Billboard described it as having a "good mix of acoustic and electric instrumentals" with Mitchell's "distinctive vocals."  Cash Box said that "lyrically, this is a total gem and the musical arrangement is letter perfect" and that "the melody is infectious." Record World said that with this song Mitchell "needs no aid other than a healthy ear from American hit-pickers to ensure her yet another triumph."

Bob Dylan selected it for inclusion on the Starbucks compilation album Joni Mitchell: Selected Songs in 2005. For the album's liner notes, Dylan wrote: "I always liked this song because I'd been to Paris and understood what being a free man there was all about.  Paris was, after all, where freedom and the guillotine lived side by side. I'm not so sure that the meaning I heard in the song was what Joni intended but I couldn't stop listening to it".

Chart performance
"Free Man in Paris" went to number 22 on the Billboard Hot 100 and to number two on the Easy Listening chart.

Notable versions and covers

In the 1970s, an instrumental version of the song was the theme music used for CBC Television's The Saturday Evening News, which aired at 6 p.m. until 1982 when it was replaced with Saturday Report. 
Aimee Mann
Neil Diamond
Sufjan Stevens (on the album A Tribute to Joni Mitchell)
Adrienne Young
Phish
Alanis Morissette
JoJo who changed the title to "White Girl in Paris". 
In April 2000 the song was performed by Elton John at an all-star celebration of Mitchell, at the Hammerstein Ballroom in New York City, presented by the TNT network.

Personnel
 Joni Mitchell – vocals, guitars
 Tom Scott – woodwinds
 José Feliciano, Larry Carlton – electric guitars
 Wilton Felder – bass
 John Guerin – drums
 David Crosby and Graham Nash – backing vocals

Charts

References

External links
 

Songs about Paris
1973 songs
1974 singles
Joni Mitchell songs
Songs written by Joni Mitchell
Song recordings produced by Joni Mitchell
Asylum Records singles